Epistrophe grossulariae is a Holarctic species of hoverfly.

Description
 External images
For terms see Morphology of Diptera
Wing length 9-12·25 mm. Thorax dull greenish. Tergite 4 with entire yellow band. At least anterior femora dark at base, sometimes hind also. Frons black above lunule and at least half black-haired. Female has a bronzy-green area on upper part of frons. Yellow bands on tergites 3 and 4 straight. Tergite 5 with black band. 

 
 Male genitalia are figured by  Hippa (1968) .
The larva is illustrated by Rotheray (1993)

Distribution
Palaearctic and Nearctic Fennoscandia South to Spain, Italy and Yugoslavia. Ireland eastwards through Turkey Russia to Kamchatka. In North America from Alaska to Quebec and South to California.

Biology
Habitat is deciduous woodland, particularly along rivers and streams, Salix swamp woodland, alpine grassland. Found in clearings, tracksides and beside streams. 
Flowers visited include white umbellifers, Centaurea, Cirsium, Filipendula, Geranium, Knautia, Rhododendron, Rubus, Sambucus nigra, Succisa,
Valeriana.
The flight period is end June to September. The larva feeds on aphids.

References

Diptera of Europe
Syrphinae
Syrphini
Insects described in 1822